Admiral Alexander Hood, 1st Viscount Bridport, KB (2 December 17262 May 1814), of Cricket St Thomas, Somerset, was an officer of the British Royal Navy during the French Revolutionary Wars and Napoleonic Wars.

Origins
 
He was a younger son of the Rev. Samuel Hood (1691/2 – 1777), Vicar of Butleigh and prebendary of Wells Cathedral (both in Somerset) and Vicar of Thorncombe in Devon (whose monument survives in St Leonard's Church, Butleigh), by his wife Mary Hoskins, a daughter of Richard Hoskins, Esquire, of Beaminster, Dorset.

His elder brother was Admiral Samuel Hood, 1st Viscount Hood (1724–1816). The sons of his first cousin Samuel Hood (1715–1805), a purser in the Royal Navy included Admiral Sir Samuel Hood, 1st Baronet (1762–1814), Captain Alexander Hood (1758–1798) and Captain Arthur Hood (1754–1776).

Career
The story of his entry into the navy is recounted by Edmund Lodge (1756–1839) (a personal acquaintance of Lord Bridport) in his Portraits of Illustrious Personages of Great Britain:

Seven Years' War

In the Seven Years' War Hood fought at the Battle of Quiberon Bay on 20 November 1759, and in 1761 Minerva recaptured after a long struggle, the 60-gun  of equal force, which had been captured by the French in 1756.

American War of Independence
From this time forward Hood was in continuous employment afloat and ashore. In the court-martial of Admiral Augustus Keppel that followed the battle, although adverse popular feeling was aroused by the course which Hood took in Keppel's defence, his conduct does not seem to have injured his professional career.

In 1780 Hood was promoted to Rear Admiral of the White, and succeeded Kempenfeldt as one of Howe's flag officers.

French Revolutionary War
Hood served in the House of Commons for a time. Promoted vice-admiral in 1787, he was appointed a Knight of the Bath in the following year, and on the occasion of the Spanish Armament in 1790 flew his flag again for a short time. On 22 October 1790 he was a member of the court that acquitted William Bligh of losing his ship . On the outbreak of war with France in 1793 he went to sea again. For his exploits in this battle he was elevated to the Irish peerage as Baron Bridport and received the large Naval Gold Medal and chain.

Henceforth Hood was practically in independent command. On 23 June 1795, with his flag in Royal George, he fought the inconclusive Battle of Groix against the French under Rear Admiral Louis Thomas Villaret de Joyeuse off the Île de Groix and captured three ships. He was much criticized in the navy for his failure to win a more decisive victory. However the British public considered the battle a great victory and his peerage was made English and he was promoted to Vice-Admiral of Great Britain.

From 1795 until Hood's retirement in 1800, he was commander of the Channel Fleet. He was about to put to sea when the Spithead fleet mutinied. He succeeded at first in pacifying the crew of his flagship, who had no personal grudge against their admiral, but a few days later the mutiny broke out afresh, and this time was uncontrollable. For a whole week the mutineers were supreme, and it was only by the greatest exertions of the old Lord Howe that order was then restored and the men returned to duty. After the mutiny had been suppressed, Hood took the fleet to sea as commander-in-chief in name as well as in fact, and from 1798 he personally directed the blockade of Brest, which grew stricter and stricter as time went on. In 1800 he was relieved by John Jervis, 1st Earl of St Vincent. In reward for Hood's fine record his peerage was made a viscounty. He spent the remaining years of his life in retirement and died on 2 May 1814.

Builds Cricket House

In 1786 he built the surviving grade II listed Georgian manor house, known as "Cricket House", to the designs of his friend the architect Sir John Soane (1753–1837). The Admiral had purchased the estate in 1775 from Richard Hippisley Coxe. It is unknown whether the new house incorporated elements of the earlier 14th century house or whether it was completely new. Soane completed further alterations in 1801–7. The Georgian orangery attached to the house was later turned into a parrot house.

Marriages
He married twice, but failed to produce any issue:
Firstly in 1758 to Maria West (c.1726-1786), known as "Molly", a daughter of the Reverend Richard West, Prebendary of Winchester, by his wife Mary Temple, a daughter of Sir Richard Temple, 3rd Baronet, of Stowe, Buckinghamshire, and sister of Richard Temple, 1st Viscount Cobham. Her modest mural monument designed by Sir John Soane (1753–1837) (who in 1786 rebuilt Cricket House for her husband) survives in Cricket St Thomas Church, comprising an urn capped by a segmental pediment surmounting a tablet inscribed as follows:
"Sacred to the Memory of Mary Wife of Rear Admiral Alexander Hood, who died 12 September 1786, After a short illness. She was Daughter of the Reverend Doctor West And Niece to Lord Viscount Cobham of Stow in Buckinghamshire Whose Eldest Sister her Father Married. From the purest sentiments of esteem And in just testimony of her pious benevolence And most amiable disposition, Her affectionate Husband, has caused this humble Monument to be Erected. 1787".
Secondly in 1788 to Mary Sophia Bray (d.1831), only daughter and heiress of Thomas Bray of Edmonton, Middlesex.

Death and succession

He died without issue on 2 May 1814 when the Viscountcy in the Peerage of the United Kingdom became extinct. His Irish barony passed by special remainder to his younger great-nephew Samuel Hood, 2nd Baron Bridport (1788–1868), the husband of Charlotte Mary Nelson, 3rd Duchess of Bronte (1787–1873), daughter and heiress of William Nelson, 1st Earl Nelson, 2nd Duke of Bronte (1757–1835), elder brother and heir of the great Admiral Horatio Nelson, 1st Viscount Nelson, 1st Duke of Bronte (1758–1805). Samuel and Charlotte's son Alexander Hood, 1st Viscount Bridport, 3rd Baron Bridport (1814–1904) (Viscountcy created 1868), 4th Duke of Bronte in Sicily, sold Cricket House and its estate in 1898 to the chocolate manufacturer Francis Fry (d.1918), the estate having become heavily mortgaged.

Burial and monument
He was buried in Cricket St Thomas Church, where survives his monument designed by his friend Sir John Soane (1753–1837), who in 1786 rebuilt Cricket House for him. It is inscribed as follows:

See also
 Hood's cousin once removed, also named Alexander Hood (1758–1798), was a captain in the Royal Navy, famous for a duel between his ship Mars and the French Hercule.

References

 William James, Naval History of Great Britain, 1793–1827.
 The Naval Chronicle, Volume 1 1799, J. Gold, London. (reissued by Cambridge University Press, 2010. )

Further reading
David R. Fisher, biography of "Hood, Sir Alexander (1726–1814), of Cricket St. Thomas, Som.", published in History of Parliament: the House of Commons 1790–1820, ed. R. Thorne, 1986

External links

|-

1726 births
1814 deaths
Royal Navy admirals
Royal Navy personnel of the Seven Years' War
Royal Navy personnel of the French Revolutionary Wars
Knights Companion of the Order of the Bath
Viscounts in the Peerage of Great Britain
Members of the Parliament of Great Britain for English constituencies
Alexander
Peers of Ireland created by George III
Peers of Great Britain created by George III